Dodyu Patarinski (born August 16, 1933 in  Ugarchin, Lovech, Bulgaria) is a Bulgarian athlete, known for jumping events.  He represented Bulgaria in the triple jump at the 1960 Olympics.  His career best was  set in 1963.  By 1969, at age 35 he was still able to jump 15.79 to set a new Masters M35 World record.

He was a two time champion of the Balkan Games.

References

1933 births
Living people
Bulgarian male triple jumpers
Olympic athletes of Bulgaria
Athletes (track and field) at the 1960 Summer Olympics
People from Lovech Province